Hardness scales may refer to:

Methods of measuring mineral hardness
 Scratch hardness
 The Mohs scale of mineral hardness
The Vickers hardness test
The Brinell scale
The Janka hardness test
The Rockwell scale
 The Durometer scale
 The Barcol scale
 The Leeb rebound hardness scale
 The Rosiwal scale
 The Meyer hardness test
 The Knoop hardness test

Other hardness scales 
Hardness scales may also refer to:
 Methods of measuring the deposit formation by hard water.
 The scale of Pencil hardness